"God Bless the U.S.A." (also known as "Proud to Be an American") is an American patriotic song written and recorded by American country music artist Lee Greenwood, and is considered to be his signature song. The first album it appears on is his 1984 album You've Got a Good Love Comin'. It reached No. 7 on the Billboard magazine Hot Country Singles chart when originally released in the spring of 1984, and was played at the 1984 Republican National Convention with President Ronald Reagan and First Lady Nancy Reagan in attendance, but the song gained greater prominence during the Gulf War in 1990 and 1991 as a way of boosting morale. As a result of its newfound popularity, Greenwood re-recorded the track for his 1992 album American Patriot.

The popularity of the song rose again sharply after the September 11 attacks and during the 2003 invasion of Iraq, and the song was re-released as a single, re-entering the country music charts at No. 16 and peaking at No. 16 on the Billboard Hot 100 pop chart in 2001. A new version of the song was recorded in 2003 and released as "God Bless the U.S.A. 2003." 

The song has sold over a million copies in the United States by July 2015.

Background and writing
Greenwood wrote "God Bless the U.S.A." in response to his feelings about the shooting down of Korean Air Lines Flight 007. He said that he "wanted to write it my whole life. When I got to that point, we were doing 300 days a year on the road, and we were on our fourth or fifth album on MCA. I called my producer, and I said I have a need to do this. I've always wanted to write a song about America, and I said we just need to be more united." As for writing the song itself, Greenwood wrote that it more or less "wrote itself", and that the lyrics flowed naturally from the music as a reflection of his pride to be American.

The reason behind the cities chosen in the song Greenwood says, "I'm from California, and I don't know anybody from Virginia or New York, so when I wrote it—and my producer and I had talked about it—[we] talked about the four cities I wanted to mention, the four corners of the United States. It could have been Seattle or Miami but we chose New York City and Los Angeles, and he suggested Detroit and Houston because they both were economically part of the basis of our economy—Motortown and the oil industry, so I just poetically wrote that in the bridge." During and post his presidency, Donald Trump used the song as his entrance tune at the beginning of all of his rallies. Additionally Greenwood, a fervent Trump supporter, himself performed the song at such rallies on multiple occasions.

Content
In the song, the singer sings about how, if he were to lose everything he had and had to start again from scratch, he would do it in the United States because he believes his freedom is guaranteed in America. He remembers how other Americans in history had died to secure this freedom, and declares that if he is ever called upon to defend the US today, he will gladly stand up and fight because he loves the country.

Music video
A music video was released for this song in 1984, depicting Greenwood as a farmer who loses the family farm. The video was produced and edited by L. A. Johnson and directed by Gary Burden. A second video was released in 1991, also on VHS, and was directed by Edd Griles. A third music video was also released after the September 11, 2001, attacks. A fourth music video in collaboration with U.S. Air Force Singing Sergeants and a cappella group Home Free was released on June 30, 2020.

Chart history
"God Bless the U.S.A." debuted on the Hot Country Singles & Tracks chart for the week of May 26, 1984.

Certifications

Other notable versions

Canadian version
In 1989, Greenwood released a Canadian version of this song called "God Bless You Canada".

Jump5 version
Pop group Jump5 covered the song for the September 11 attacks in October 2001, altering some of the lyrics: "And I had to start again with just my children and my wife" became "And I had to start again with just my family by my side", and "I thank my lucky stars" became "I thank my God above" to reflect the group's Christian values.

Dolly Parton version
Dolly Parton recorded the song for her 2003 patriotic album, For God and Country.

American Idol finalists' version
In 2003, the song was performed by the American Idol season two finalists and released as a single, with part of the proceeds going to the American Red Cross. It raised $155,000 for the charity. It reached No. 4 on the Billboard Hot 100, and it was certified gold by the RIAA the same year.

Beyoncé version
Again, following the death of Osama bin Laden, Beyoncé re-released her 2008 cover of the song, the proceeds of which would go to charity. She performed the song on Piers Morgan Tonight on May 5, 2011. After the performance, her version was released as a single to the iTunes Store. In a statement she said, "I cannot think about anything more appropriate to do to help these families ... Almost 10 years [after 9/11], it is still so painful for all Americans, especially those who lost loved ones. We were all affected by the tragedies of 9/11 and continue to keep the families who lost loved ones close to our hearts ..." Dan Martin of The Guardian felt that the cover was "in contrast" to her last intervention in national affairs, the Let's Move! Flash Workout fitness initiative. Ronald Mitchell of Newsday commented that "It does our hearts good to see Beyoncé work her magic for the greater good." She later also performed the song for the concert she had on July 4, 2011, along with "Best Thing I Never Had" (2011). Nick Neyland of Prefix Magazine commented that "Beyoncé is a natural fit for occasions like this, and she doesn't even break a sweat as she hits the high notes despite the soaring temperatures and humidity in the city. That's the mark of a true pro." In Beyoncé's version, the end of the second verse is sung "And it's time to make a change", as well as changing, "If I had to start again with just my children and my wife" to "family by my side."

Home Free version
Country a cappella group Home Free has been performing the song ever since the band's inception in 2000, and released an official music video on June 30, 2016. As of June 26, 2020, the music video has amassed 11 million views on YouTube. In 2020, Home Free worked in the studio with Greenwood and re-recorded the song with him and the United States Air Force Band Singing Sergeants. The music was released on July 1 on Home Free's channel.

See also
 "God Bless America", song written by Irving Berlin
 Ronald Reagan in music

References

Further reading
Collins, Ace. Songs Sung, Red, White, and Blue: The Stories Behind America's Best-Loved Patriotic Songs.  HarperResource, 2003.

External links
[ Allmusic Entry]

1984 singles
2001 singles
Beyoncé songs
American patriotic songs
Kristy Lee Cook songs
Lee Greenwood songs
MCA Nashville Records singles
Songs written by Lee Greenwood
Song recordings produced by Jerry Crutchfield
Songs about the United States
1984 songs
September 11 attacks